Susana Zabaleta Ramos (born September 30, 1964) is a Mexican soprano singer and actress.

Early life
Born in Monclova, Coahuila, she moved to Mexico City in 1985. In 1986 she performed in the Sala Ollín Yoliztli and interpreted opera performances, such as La Traviata, Dido and Aeneas and Eneas. She also performed with the group Quien es quien.

Career
In 1987 Zabaleta debuted on stage in the Mexican production of the musicals Fiddler on the Roof and Don Quijote de la Mancha. In 1989 she participated in the musicals ¡Que plantón! and Sor-Presas.  In 1991 she participated in the Mexican production of Cats along with María del Sol.

In 1995, she recorded her first album titled ¿O fué un sueño? and in 1996, recorded the Spanish version of the song "Colors of the Wind" for the Disney film Pocahontas.

Zabaleta's acting career began in 1993 appearing in some telenovelas. In 1996 she starred in the horror film Sobrenatural, a film directed by her husband, the film director Daniel Gruener.

In 1999, she participated in the Mexican film Sexo, pudor y lagrimas (directed by Antonio Serrano) for which she won the Ariel Award for Best Actress.

In recent years, Zabaleta collaborated with the Mexican composer Armando Manzanero with whom she has recorded two albums: de la A a la Z (2006) and Amarrados (2009).

In 2011, Zabaleta debuted as host of her own TV show, Susana Adicción, on Unicable network.

Filmography

Film

Television

Stage credits

Discography
1995 – ¿O...fue un sueño? 
1997 – Desde el baño 
2002 – El pasado nos vuelve a pasar 
2002 – Navidad 
2004 – Quiero sentir bonito 
2005 – Para darle cuerda al mundo 
2006 – De la A a la Z 
2007 – Te Busqué 
2010 – Amarrados 
2013 – La Sensatez Y La Cordura 
2017 – Como La Sal

References

External links

1964 births
Living people
20th-century Mexican women opera singers
Mexican film actresses
Mexican telenovela actresses
Mexican television actresses
Mexican stage actresses
Ariel Award winners
People from Monclova
Actresses from Coahuila
Musicians from Coahuila
Mexican sopranos
21st-century Mexican women singers